Qemal Mustafaraj (born 1 July 1995 in Fier) is an Albanian professional footballer who most recently played for Apolonia Fier in the Albanian First Division.

Club career
Mustafaraj left Apolonia in summer 2017 after only joining them earlier in that year from Bylis Ballsh.

References

1995 births
Living people
Sportspeople from Fier
Association football forwards
Albanian footballers
KF Bylis Ballsh players
KF Apolonia Fier players
Kategoria Superiore players
Kategoria e Parë players